Raid on Lunenburg, Nova Scotia may refer to:

 Raid on Lunenburg, Nova Scotia (1782)
 Raid on Lunenburg, Nova Scotia (1756)